150 California Street is a 24-story,  office tower skyscraper located on California Street in the financial district of San Francisco, California.

History 
Construction of the building was completed in 2000 and the building was designed by architecture firm Hellmuth, Obata + Kassabaum. In 2002, the AIA San Francisco and The San Francisco Business Times honored its designers with the 2002 Honor Award for Architecture.

Tenants
GCA Savvian

See also
 List of tallest buildings in San Francisco

References

Financial District, San Francisco
Office buildings completed in 2000
Skyscraper office buildings in San Francisco
HOK (firm) buildings